Tillysburn railway station was a railway station on the Bangor line of the Belfast and County Down Railway.

As of the 2000s, the site was proposed as a station to serve the area between Belfast and Holywood on the Bangor line. The "Belfast Metropolitan Area Plan 2015", published in 2014, proposed that the station be used as part of a rail link to both the Holywood Exchange retail development and George Best Belfast City Airport. As of 2009, it was reported that the station would serve the planned national stadium and as a park and ride facility for the areas around Holywood.

The pressure group, Rail 21, in a submission to the BMAP plan, raised objections about what the new station was expected to do, in that the proposed site was a similar distance from the airport terminal to Sydenham station. Instead, the pressure group proposed a dedicated airport station, with Tillysburn used for the retail development and as a park and ride. As of 2009, Northern Ireland Railways was concentrating on the renovation of the Derry line, so any expansion of service to the east of Belfast remains an unfunded proposal.

References

Disused railway stations in County Down
Proposed railway stations in Northern Ireland
Railway stations in County Down
Transport in County Down